Robert Hoe (1784–1833), born in Leicestershire, England, was a master carpenter and machinist in the United States, to which he emigrated in 1803.  In 1823 he became sole proprietor of the R. Hoe & Company, retiring in 1832. A skilled mechanic, he constructed and introduced the original Hoe press and was, it is thought, the earliest American machinist to utilize steam as a motive power in his plant.

Family
He was born in the village of Hose in Leicestershire, England. His parents were Richard Hoe and Ann March. He was the father of Peter Smith Hoe (1821 - 1902) (who resided at Sunnyslope), Richard March Hoe (1812-1886) and Robert Hoe (1815-1884). Richard became an inventor, developing the rotary printing press, which revolutionized newspaper publishing. Robert II (19 July 1815 New York City - 13 September 1884 Tarrytown, New York) was associated with his father and elder brother Richard in business.  He was one of the founders of the National Academy of Design, and a patron of young artists. His son Robert Hoe III became President of R. Hoe Printers upon his father's death.  He was also well known as one of the foremost bibliophiles in the country at the time bibliophile. His book collection and much of his art was sold by the American Art Association in 1911 for $2 million in sales, at the time a record.

Notes

References

External links
 

19th-century American inventors
British emigrants to the United States
Businesspeople from New York City
1784 births
1833 deaths
19th-century American businesspeople